Skowronki may refer to the following places:
Skowronki, Greater Poland Voivodeship (west-central Poland)
Skowronki, Masovian Voivodeship (east-central Poland)
Skowronki, Pomeranian Voivodeship (north Poland)
Skowronki, Warmian-Masurian Voivodeship (north Poland)